Major Rama Raghoba Rane, PVC (26 June 1918 – 11 July 1994) was an officer in the Indian Army. He was the first living recipient of the Param Vir Chakra along with Karam Singh, India's highest military decoration.

Born in 1918, Rane served in the British Indian Army during the Second World War. He remained in the military during the post-war period and was commissioned in the Bombay Sappers Regiment of the Indian Army's Corps of Engineers on 15 December 1947. In April 1948, during the Indo-Pakistani War of 1947, Rane played a key role in the capture of Rajauri by Indian forces by being instrumental in clearing several roadblocks and minefields. His actions helped clear the way for advancing Indian tanks. He was awarded the Param Vir Chakra on 8 April 1948 for his gallantry. He retired as a major from the Indian Army in 1968. During his 28 years' service with the army, he was mentioned in despatches five times. He died in 1994 at the age of 76.

Early life
Rama Raghoba Rane was born on 26 June 1918 in the Chendia village, Karnataka in a Konkani speaking Maratha family. He was the son of Raghoba. P. Rane, a police constable from Chendia village of Uttara Kannada district in Karnataka. Rane's early education, mostly in district school, was chaotic due to his father's frequent transfers. In 1930, he became influenced by the Non-Cooperation Movement, which campaigned for Indian independence from British rule. His involvement with the movement alarmed his father, who moved the family back to their ancestral village at Chendia.

Military career
At the age of 22, Rane decided to join the British Indian Army, while the Second World War was in full swing. On 10 July 1940, Rane enlisted in the Bombay Engineer Regiment, and passed out as the "Best Recruit", awarded the Commandant's Cane. Subsequently, he was promoted to Naik (corporal).

After his training, Rane was posted to the 28th Field Company, an engineering unit of the 26th Infantry Division which, at the time, was fighting the Japanese in Burma. As his division retreated from the Japanese after the failed Arakan Campaign, he, along with his two sections, was hand-picked by his company commander to stay back behind at Buthidaung to destroy key assets and then be evacuated by the Royal Indian Navy. Though the objective was soon achieved, the expected pickup did not happen. This forced Rane and his men to cross a river that was patrolled by the Japanese to reach their lines. Rane, along with his two sections, expertly evaded the Japanese troops, and joined the 26th Infantry Division at Bahri. For his actions, he was promoted to havaldar (sergeant) 

Rane later received a Viceroy's Commission as a jemadar (now the rank of naib subedar, equivalent to a warrant officer). For his persistence and leadership qualities, Rane was selected for a short-service commission prior to the partition. In 1947, following his country's independence, Rane remained in the new Indian Army and was commissioned in the Corps of Engineers on 15 December 1947 as a second lieutenant (seniority from 14 January 1948).

War of 1947

On 18 March 1948, Jhangar, lost in December 1947 to the Pakistanis, was recaptured by troops of the Indian Army, which then started to move towards Rajauri from Naushahra sector. On 8 April 1948, the 4th Dogra Battalion advanced to Rajauri. During the advance, the battalion attacked and captured the Barwali ridge, eleven kilometers to the north of Naushahra. The battalion's advance beyond Barwali was obstructed by the increasing number of roadblocks and minefields. Supporting tanks were also unable to cross the obstacles.

Rane, in command of a section of the 37th Assault Field Company, attached to the 4th Dogra Battalion, was sent forward to help clear a path for the battalion. As Rane and his team started clearing a minefield, mortar fire from the Pakistanis killed two sappers and wounded five others, including Rane. Despite this, by the evening of 8 April, Rane and his surviving men cleared the minefield which enabled the supporting tanks to move forward. A safe lane still had to be prepared for the tanks as the road ahead was still dangerous; the Pakistani forces had yet to be cleared from the area. This lane was created by Rane through the night. The next day, his section worked for twelve continuous hours to clear mines and roadblocks. As the road was still too difficult to deal with, he made a diversion for the battalion to forward. Rane continued this work despite ongoing artillery and mortar fire from the Pakistanis.

On 10 April, Rane got up early and resumed work on an obstacle that had not been cleared the previous night. Within a span of two hours, he cleared the roadblock of five large pine trees in the midst of mines and machine-gun fire. This allowed the 4th Dogra Battalion to advance another thirteen kilometers until it encountered another major roadblock. The Pakistani forces were situated on the adjoining hills and able to fire on all approaches to the block, making its destruction problematic. Rane drove a tank to the roadblock and took cover behind the tank while blasting open the roadblock with mines, opening the road before the end of the night.

The next day, Rane worked for another seventeen hours to open the road to Chingas, which lay half-way between Rajauri and Naushahra on an old Mughal route, and beyond. During the period from 8 to 11 April, he had made a significant contribution in the Indian advance to Rajauri. His work not only cost the Pakistani forces about 500 dead and many more wounded, but also saved many civilians in the area from Chingas and Rajauri.

Param Vir Chakra
On 21 June 1950, Rane's award of the Param Vir Chakra, for his actions on 8 April 1948 during the advance to Rajauri, was gazetted. The official citation reads:

Subsequent career and later life
After the war, Rane was promoted to lieutenant on 14 January 1950 and to captain on 14 January 1954. On 27 May 1955, he received a regular commission as a captain, with the service number IC-7244. He retired with the rank of major on 25 June 1968. During the course of his military's career, Rane was mentioned in despatches five times. He was subsequently employed as a member of the civilian staff of the Indian Army. He remained in the employment of the army until 7 April 1971 at which time he retired from the workforce.  He died in 1994 at Command Hospital, Southern Command in Pune, survived by his wife, three sons and a daughter.

Legacy

The Shipping Corporation of India (SCI), a Government of India enterprise under the aegis of the Ministry of Shipping, named fifteen of her crude oil tankers in honour of the Param Vir Chakra recipients. The crude oil tanker named MT Lieutenant Rama Raghoba Rane, PVC was delivered to SCI on 8 August 1984. The tanker was phased out after 25 years service.

A statue in Rane's memory was unveiled in a ceremony on 7 November 2006 in his hometown Karwar at Rabindranath Tagore beach, Karnataka, alongside INS Chapal Warship Museum. It was inaugurated by Shivanand Naik, former Minister for Small Industries, and presided over then Flag Officer Commander-in-Chief, Western Command,  Vice Admiral Sangram Singh Byce.

Notes

References

References

Indian Army officers
Recipients of the Param Vir Chakra
1918 births
1994 deaths
People from Uttara Kannada
People from Karwar
British Indian Army soldiers
Indian Army personnel of World War II